Segundo Castillo may refer to:

 Segundo Castillo (footballer, 1913–1993), Peruvian football midfielder
 Segundo Castillo (footballer, born 1982), Ecuadorian football defensive midfielder